R-2 regional road is a Montenegrin roadway. 

It serves as mayor connection between four eastern municipalities of Berane, Andrijevica, Plav, Gusinje. Section between           Andrijevica and Berane will be a parallel road to section of Bar–Boljare motorway. As of 2017, no work has been done on this section of motorway.

History

Section from Andrijevica to Murino was part of M-9 highway which was officially opened for traffic in 1984. It was built as part of the larger M-9 highway within the Yugoslav highway network, spanning Montenegro, Kosovo and Serbia. It connected Kolašin and Andrijevica with Peć and Priština in Kosovo, and Leskovac and Pirot in Serbia. 

In January 2016, the Ministry of Transport and Maritime Affairs published bylaw on categorisation of state roads. With new categorisation, R-2 regional road was lengthened, and now it includes part of previous M-9 highway and complete previous R-9 regional road. M-9 highway was downgraded and split to several regional roads.

Major intersections

References

R-2